Jerusalem Technology Park, also Malha Technology Park (Hagan HaTechnologi Malha) is a high-tech industrial park located in the Malha neighborhood of southwest Jerusalem.

The Park was designed and built as part of urban development plan that puts an emphasis on integrating the urban fabric with the surrounding landscape, while creating a quality working environment. Within the park, in-between its buildings, there is also a Sculpture garden.

Tenants

The park is owned and managed by Isras Group, which offers office space in the park to rent only, while providing management and maintenance services. 70% of the tenants are Hi-tech sector companies and 30% are from the business services and media sectors.  Notable tenants include: 
 IBM R&D Labs in Israel
 Ex Libris Group
 Israel Innovation Authority
 Freightos
 Visionix
 Nanonics Imaging
 Pepticom
 Embassy of the Republic of Guatemala
 Embassy of the Republic of Paraguay

See also
Har Hotzvim Technology Park
Science and technology in Israel
Silicon Wadi

References

External links
Photo of the Jerusalem Technology Park

Neighbourhoods of Jerusalem
Science parks in Israel
Economy of Jerusalem
2002 establishments in Israel
High-technology business districts in Israel